The Brattleboro Reformer is the third-largest daily newspaper in the U.S. state of Vermont. With a weekday circulation of just over 10,000, it is behind the Burlington Free Press and the Rutland Herald, respectively. It publishes six days a week, Monday through Saturday, with its Weekend Reformer having the largest readership; the offices of the paper are in Brattleboro, Vermont and it has a market penetration (weekday sales per 100 households) of 62.8 in its home zip code.

The Reformer covers all of Windham County, Vermont, as well as some towns in neighboring Cheshire County, New Hampshire. It is owned by Vermont News and Media LLC.

It is the only newspaper in the United States called "Reformer."

History from 19th to mid-20th century
The Reformer published its first issue, under the name Windham County Reformer, in 1876. Publisher Charles N. Davenport was a prominent lawyer and supporter of the Democratic Party. Davenport founded the paper in part due to dissatisfaction with what he saw as a Republican bias in the coverage by the Vermont Phoenix, the main political paper in the state. The presidential campaign at the time, between Republican Rutherford B. Hayes and Democrat Samuel J. Tilden prompted the Vermont Record and Farmer, the third paper in the state, to describe the new paper as dedicated to "Tilden and reform."

Some local historians believe that the original conception of the paper was for it to last only for the duration of the 1876 campaign. Davenport's son, Charles H. inherited the paper on his father's death, running the paper for twenty-five years until 1901. T. P. James, (whose fame rests on his publication of the ending to "Mystery of Edwin Drood, Complete" which James claimed Dicken's ghost had dictated to him) was the co-editor and co-publisher of the Reformer, along with Charles H. Davenport.(James left the paper within about a year, after a disagreement with Davenport, and founded the Independent in Brattleboro, in which he attacked Davenport's reputation.) The Reformer went from a weekly to twice-weekly publication schedule in 1897. While the paper had financial troubles for many years, it managed to maintain a continuous publication schedule.

Charles H sold the paper to G. Ullery, who then sold the paper to the Vermont Printing company in 1903. The new editors turned the paper away from its partisan Democrat emphasis. The Phoenix and Reformer were merged in March 1913 under the management of the newly formed Brattleboro Publishing Company, one half owned by Walter Hubbard and the other half by Ephraim Crane and Howard Crosby Rice. Rice became the publisher and editor in 1918. The Phoenix served as the Reformer'''s weekly companion. Moreover, the Reformer went to a daily publication schedule. The Phoenix weekly was discontinued in 1955.

Howard Rice was publisher and editor of the Reformer until he handed over the editor post to his son-in-law, John Simpson Hooper, in 1950, and the publisher post in 1964. John Hooper was editor and publisher of the Reformer until he retired in 1971. He was instrumental in turning the paper from a Republican to an independent paper, described on its masthead as: "An independent newspaper, dedicated to conservation and progress in public and humane affairs". In 1971, Norman Runnion became managing editor until 1989.

The 1913 merger was considered by some to be the "true" founding date of the paper; according to an article in the March 4, 1925 issue, "Daily Reformer Now 15 Years Old":

The Brattleboro Daily Reformer celebrated yesterday its 15th anniversary as a daily.  As a weekly publication The Reformer dates back to the dim and distant date of 1876, but its debut as a daily – with that word ‘Daily’ in emphatic black-face letter-spaced Gothic type on its first page – came on Monday, March 3, 1913.

Records at the Brooks Memorial Library, the main library of Brattleboro, list the publication history of the paper in 2006 asWindham County Reformer, 1876-1897Semi-weekly Windham County Reformer, 1897-1901Windham County Reformer, 1901-1912,Brattleboro Daily Reformer (after merger with Vermont Phoenix), 1913-1955Brattleboro Daily Reformer and Vermont Phoenix, 1955-1973Brattleboro Reformer, 1973-present

Much of the historical information in this section comes from a special 1981 section of the Reformer, published on the occasion of the paper's moving from downtown Brattleboro to its headquarters on Black Mountain Road.

The Reformer in the late-20th and 21st centuries
By the time Howard Rice died, he wholly owned the Reformer, leaving it in his will to his three children, Howard, Eleanor and Marion (and her husband John Hooper). It was then sold to the Miller Group of Newspapers in Pittsfield, Mass. By January 2015, it was owned by New England Newspaper Incorporated, under corporate owner, Digital First Media, which at the time was trying to sell off its 76 daily and 160 weekly newspapers. By July 2015, the Reformer had only two reporters left and the editor post was shared with the Bennington Banner.  New England Newspapers was sold to local owners in 2016. In May of 2021 the New England Newspapers sold Brattleboro Reformer, Bennington Banner and Manchester Journal to Vermont News and Media LLC.

The Reformer was possibly the first newspaper in the United States to run same-sex union announcements in parallel to the usual wedding notices, beginning the practice in 1989, well before the state of Vermont legalized civil unions.

In the past the paper has been controversial for running letters to the editor that many have found offensive; in 2003 it ran an anti-semitic letter whose publication the then–managing editor Kathryn Casa defended, saying that "only by bringing [bigoted opinions] into the open can we expose and eliminate them."

Casa was replaced by Kevin Moran, who was recruited from the North Adams Transcript in Massachusetts, which is also owned by MediaNews Group. Moran moved to work as managing editor at the Berkshire Eagle.

In November 2005, the Reformer hired Sabina Haskell as the new editor. She had previously been assistant editor at the Rutland Herald and had also run the Bennington Banner. Haskell quit to take a PR job for Republican Vermont governor Jim Douglas in 2007. Then managing news editor Tom D'Errico was promoted to fill the editor position.

The publisher of the Reformer, Martin Langeveld, resigned after two years on the job in April 2008. Ed Woods, publisher of the Bennington Banner, replaced him in the same month.

The Brattleboro Reformer is owned by Vermont News and Media LLC, which is owned by Paul Belogour.

Staff and union controversies
The paper was involved in a number of controversies in the years 2003–2004.

Union leaders and members of the public  protested in 2003, when the management fired a reporter during a campaign to form a union at the Reformer. More than 1,000 people signed a petition that called on Media News to re-hire the union supporter.see Boston Globe article published May 22, 2003Valley Advocate  

Readers complained when the parent company fired managing editor Kathryn Casa without giving a reason in 2004. Critics asserted that the firing was in part connected to her liberal politics; on the other hand, Casa was accused of intimidating staff into voting against a union drive. Judith Gorman, a columnist for the paper, resigned in protest following Casa's dismissal; about 150 people protested Casa's dismissal outside the Reformer offices on April 25 of that year.

 Footnotes 

References
 Kevin O'Conner, “The Reformer: From a Campaign Sheet to a Daily Newspaper.” Brattleboro Reformer'', 17 November 1981, supplement: "Then and Now: The Brattleboro Reformer," pp. 18–21.

External links
 

MediaNews Group publications
Newspapers published in Vermont
Windham County, Vermont
Brattleboro, Vermont
1876 establishments in Vermont
Publications established in 1876